BT100 was an impact 1-pin dot matrix printer produced in Czechoslovakia by TESLA Přelouč around 1989. It did not have ribbon, instead printed on a carbon copy paper.

Design
The printer was improvement over hobby printer CENTRUM T-85 and was designed to be very primitive and therefore cheap printer for 8-bit home computers. In BT100 ink ribbon was completely omitted. Instead single nail hit paper backed by carbon copy paper to print single dot on back side of paper. This arrangement was introduced to protect thin carbon copy paper from direct hit by nail.
Also internal electronics was simple. Printer head was single nail with electromagnet driven by software on home computer. One direction motor for paper movement and two directions motor to move printer head were also controlled directly from computer. To give necessary feedback, motor axes were connected to plastic disc with cutouts on perimeter. LED and photoresistor were placed against disc cutouts and as the disc rotated light beam would reach photoresistor only when facing a cutout. This way distance travelled by motors could be measured, again directly from software.
With provided drivers the printer would print 480 points across A4 (58 DPI) with 560 lines on page (48 DPI). That is 70 lines with 60 to 80 characters on line. Printer could print one A4 page in 10 minutes in low quality. Higher quality was available at cost of doubling the time. It was even possible to print on same paper several times using carbon copy papers of different colors to produce low quality color print.

Compatibility
The printer was released with driver for ZX Spectrum, Atari (800 XL/XE, 130XE), PMD 85 computers. Due to hardware simplicity it is possible to connect BT100 to many other computers. For example, in 2013, a hobbyist successfully printed on BT100 connected to |Raspberry Pi.

Reception
BT100 was considered to be slow, noisy and low quality printer even in time its introduction. Still, being most available and by margin cheapest printer in Czechoslovakia, it gained popularity as entry level solution. Simple design also encouraged modifications on both hardware and software levels, many of them increased print quality at cost of slower print.
It was also sold built into a tape recorder under the name SP 210 T.

References

External links 
 Some information 
 More information (in Czech)
 Even more information (in Slovak, with print example)
 Print with BT100 on Atari 800XL (YouTube)
 Czech manual for BT100

Computer printers
Science and technology in Czechoslovakia